Poly [ADP-ribose] polymerase 2 is an enzyme that in humans is encoded by the PARP2 gene. It is one of the PARP family of enzymes.

Function 

This gene encodes poly(ADP-ribosyl)transferase-like 2 protein, which contains a catalytic domain and is capable of catalyzing a poly(ADP-ribosyl)ation reaction. This protein has a catalytic domain which is homologous to that of poly (ADP-ribosyl) transferase, but lacks an N-terminal DNA binding domain which activates the C-terminal catalytic domain of poly (ADP-ribosyl) transferase. The basic residues within the N-terminal region of this protein may bear potential DNA-binding properties, and may be involved in the nuclear and/or nucleolar targeting of the protein. Two alternatively spliced transcript variants encoding distinct isoforms have been found.

In the plant species Arabidopsis thaliana, PARP2 plays more significant roles than PARP1 in protective responses to DNA damage and bacterial pathogenesis.  The plant PARP2 carries N-terminal SAP DNA binding motifs rather than the Zn-finger DNA binding motifs of plant and animal PARP1 proteins.

PARP inhibitor drugs
Some PARP inhibitor anti-cancer drugs (primarily aimed at PARP1) also inhibit PARP2, e.g. niraparib.

Interactions 
PARP2 has been shown to interact with XRCC1.

References

Further reading

External links